The Cairn Energy and Government of India dispute is mainly an ongoing tax and investment dispute which has its origins in 2005–2006. The case is closely linked to Cairn's partner in India, Vedanta, and to concepts such Ex post facto law in the form of retrospective taxation, bilateral investment treaties, and international arbitration between private and sovereign states.

Proceedings in the private investor-state arbitration (Cairn Energy PLC & Cairn UK Holdings Limited v. The Republic of India) at the Permanent Court of Arbitration in The Hague began on 22 September 2015 under United Nations Commission on International Trade Law (UNCITRAL) rules. To enforce the arbitration award, Cairn has registered the award around the world including in countries such as United States, United Kingdom, Canada, France, Singapore, Mauritius, UAE, Cayman Islands and Netherlands. In May 2021, Cairn sued Air India in New York. In July 2021, Tribunal judiciaire de Paris accepts Cairn's claim to seize Indian properties in France.

The case includes Vedanta Resources PLC v. Government of India in the Income Tax Appellate Tribunal of India, as well as a case in the High Court of Delhi.

India amended its income tax law in 2012, adding an amendment/clarification allowing for it to collect tax on old investments. While India applied the law on Cairn in 2015, it had done the same in 2014 to Vodafone. The case went to the Permanent Court of Arbitration and in September 2020, Vodafone got a ruling in its favour. In August 2021 India scrapped its retrospective tax provision.

Timeline

Before 2000

After 2000

See also 

 Bifurcation (law)
Ex post facto law
State immunity

References

Bibliography 

 

Arbitration cases
Taxation in India
Ex post facto case law
Permanent Court of Arbitration cases